Alfred Johnson Brooks,  (November 14, 1890 – December 7, 1967) was a Canadian parliamentarian.

A teacher and barrister by training, Brooks represented King's County in the Legislative Assembly of New Brunswick from 1925 to 1935. He first won a seat in the House of Commons of Canada in the 1935 general election as the Conservative Member of Parliament for Royal, New Brunswick. He was re-elected on six successive occasions.

Following the election of the Progressive Conservative government of John Diefenbaker in the 1957 election, Brooks joined the Cabinet as Minister of Veterans Affairs and Acting Minister of National Health and Welfare.

In 1960, Diefenbaker appointed Brooks to the Senate of Canada, allowing Hugh John Flemming to succeed Brooks in his New Brunswick riding through a by-election. Brooks served as Leader of the Government in the Canadian Senate from 1962 to 1963. Following the defeat of the Diefenbaker government, he became Leader of the Opposition in the Canadian Senate until his retirement from the Senate in October 1967, shortly before his death.

Electoral history

External links
 

1890 births
1967 deaths
Lawyers in New Brunswick
Canadian King's Counsel
Canadian senators from New Brunswick
Members of the House of Commons of Canada from New Brunswick
Members of the King's Privy Council for Canada
Progressive Conservative Party of Canada MPs
Progressive Conservative Party of Canada senators
Progressive Conservative Party of New Brunswick MLAs
Canadian Ministers of Health and Welfare